Prionurus chrysurus is a tropical fish endemic to the coral reefs around Indonesia. The species was first described by John Ernest Randall in 2001. It is commonly known as the Indonesian sawtail.

References

Prionurus
Fish described in 2001